Petříkov is a rural village, administratively a part of Ostružná in the Olomouc Region of the Czech Republic. It is located in the Hrubý Jeseník mountains, 15 kilometres from the town of Jeseník.

History
The village was founded c. 1617 by Hanuš Petřvaldský and was originally known as Peterswald (Peter's Forest). It has a chapel (built in 1909) dedicated to St. Lawrence.

Sport
Petříkov is known for a ski resort. The ski resort also has a summer "bobsled" run.

References

Populated places in Jeseník District
Neighbourhoods in the Czech Republic
Ski areas and resorts in the Czech Republic